The Rolex Oyster Perpetual Milgauss is a wristwatch model introduced by Rolex in 1956 with model number 6541. The Milgauss was advertised as “designed to meet the demands of the scientific community working around electromagnetic fields”. The first of its kind, it is capable of withstanding magnetic fields of up to 1,000 gauss and became known for being worn by scientists at the European Organization for Nuclear Research (CERN) in Geneva. Its resistance to magnetic interference stems from a shield inside the case made of ferromagnetic alloys, which protects the movement. This shield consists of two components, one screwed to the movement and the other to the case. In addition, its Caliber 3131 movement includes paramagnetic materials.

The name Milgauss is derived from the French mille, which means one-thousand, and gauss, the unit of a magnetic field.

Original model 
The original Milgauss was very similar to the appearance of the Rolex Submariner, with an oversized case and bezel, with the Twinlock crown, and a riveted Oyster bracelet. Although the Milgauss went through only two different models (6541, 1019) the Milgauss went through numerous configuration changes before being discontinued in 1988. In the 1960s, Rolex launched the Milgauss ref. 1019. However, this particular model looks so different from its predecessors that at first glance the Milgauss link (aside from the red MILGAUSS text) is not immediately clear.

The Milgauss remains a sought-after model amongst Rolex collectors due to its relatively low sales and popularity during the 1960s and 70s, it has become rare in today's vintage watch market. A vintage Milgauss signed by Tiffany & Co. recently sold for over $32,000.

Versions 

In 2007, Rolex brought back the Milgauss after nearly 20 years, as model number 116400. The model initially came in three versions: A dark grey/black dial with white batons and orange squares on the minute track at the batons; a white dial with orange batons and orange minute track; a black dial with orange and white batons and a green sapphire crystal. The first two of these versions are now discontinued. There is currently an additional version in production: a blue dial with a green-tinted sapphire crystal. The Milgauss is the only Rolex produced with a tinted crystal.

Because of its internal magnetic shield the Milgauss is thicker than the Submariner, but the same width. It weighs 157 grams. The Milgauss is available only in 904L polished stainless steel, which is extremely resistant to scratches and corrosion.  Apart from its resistance to magnetic fields, the Milgauss' most unusual feature is its orange lightning-bolt second hand, a unique feature originally introduced with the 6541 Milgauss model.

In 2008, the recommended retail price was $6,200 and it was selling at or below this price.  A short time before its release, resellers and retailers were asking as much as double retail in anticipation of the new model. As of 2022, the MSRP for a GV Milgauss is $9,150.

See also 

 Rolex Daytona
 Rolex Day-Date
 Rolex Datejust
 Rolex GMT Master II
 Rolex Sea Dweller
 Rolex Submariner
 Rolex Yacht-Master

References

External links
Rolex, the official site.
TimeKeeperForum In-Depth Review
Parachrom Blue Hairspring Video

Rolex watches
Products introduced in 1956